Thin Thin Soe (born 3 October 1989) is a Burmese footballer who plays as a goalkeeper. She has been a member of the Myanmar women's national team.

International career
Thin Thin Soe capped for Myanmar at senior level during the 2010 AFC Women's Asian Cup and the 2014 AFC Women's Asian Cup qualification).

References

1989 births
Living people
Women's association football goalkeepers
Burmese women's footballers
People from Ayeyarwady Region
Myanmar women's international footballers